Kielce University can refer to:
 Kielce University of Technology
 Jan Kochanowski University in Kielce